The National Theatre of Albania was the main theatre in Tirana, Albania. In March 2020, the National Theatre of Albania was selected by Europa Nostra among the 7 most endangered monuments in Europe, as an exceptional example of  modern Italian architecture from the 1930s and one of the most prominent cultural centers in Albania, facing impending threat of demolition.  On 17 May 2020, the National Theatre building was demolished.

History

The first theatre play in Albania was organised in Gjirokastër in 1874. The first theatre building Salla e Kolegjit Severian with 450 seats was built in Shkodër in 1890, by the Order of Jesuits.

The National and Experimental Theater Complex was a historical artifact that witnessed many events related to the creation of the Albanian theater, but has also served as the stage for artistic, academic, and political events in post-World War II Albania.

The complex presented various historical layers of interventions that attested to different architectural and engineering styles and approaches of the time. It represented an important stage in the history of urban planning and modern architecture, especially after the long Ottoman period that did not include such concepts of urban planning.

The National Theater building started as the Italian-Albanian Circle named "Circolo Scanderbeg". Until its demolition, it was the first construction of a cultural and sport complex that preserved its cultural function. The materials and techniques applied in this construction were considered innovative for Italy and beyond at European level.

After its opening, the "Savoy" Theater, known in the 1940s as Kino-Theater "Kosova", became the centre, where the most important cultural institutions would be established in post-war Albania. Given these historical facts, this architectural complex was part of the country's cultural and national identity.

The innovative materials — most specifically a material called "Populit" panels, a new material composed of mineralized wood fibers with high strength concrete, was thermally and acoustically insulating. — and techniques applied in this construction were not only used in Albania, but were also considered for Italy and beyond at European level.

After its opening, the "Savoy" Theater, known in the 1940s as the Theater of Kosovo, after 1945 (at the end of World War II) as "the National" and "National Theater" in modern times, became the center where some of the most important cultural institutions would be established in post-war Albania. Given these historical facts, this architectural complex is part of the country's cultural and national identity.

The interventions of 1950–1954 proved the engagement of some of the most prominent architects after World War II in the country, such as A. Lufi, S. Pashallari, and others. Also, the presence of working groups of Soviet architects like D. Vasiliev shows the impact of Soviet neoclassicism on the increased volume of internal courtyard closure, which remained in good shape until the building's destruction.

Engineers and architects engaged in additional projects and structures (after 1945) and the solutions they apply demonstrate not only their care for the harmonization of the structures of the different phases, but at the same time these interventions prove to us today the political changes in the country by applying techniques and materials different from those of the autarchy period.

The complex was a turning point on the monumental axis, as it is the first rationalist object after a period of neoclassical construction. It is also one of the first rationalist buildings in Albania. The facility was first realized with prefabricated elements and innovative materials at the time, not only in Albania but also beyond. The cultural and sports complex is also the first facility with the pool still existing in the atrium. Scholars classify it as a rationalist building with the influences of Sant Elia and De Chirico's futurism and paintings.

It was later called the Kosovo Movie Theater. The inauguration and naming to Professional Theater of the State occurred on 24 May 1945. Later the theater was called Popular Theater. It held that name until June 1991 when it was called 'National Theater'.

Protest and demolition

In 2018, the Albanian government, under Prime Minister Edi Rama, decided to demolish and replace the theater with a new building designed by Bjarke Ingels Group. The National Theatre was relocated to a temporary modern venue named ArTurbina located on Sami Frasheri Street in Tirana.

Plans of the authorities for a new building for the national theater were criticized by artists, professionals and citizens, which led to protests and also the declaration of the historic building as one of the 7 Most Endangered Heritage Sites in Europe by Europa Nostra.

National Theater is considered one of the most significant monuments of autarchy period in Albania at the beginning of 20th century

Regardless of constant protest by Albanian artists together with the political opposition, the demolition of the National Theatre of Albania started approximately on 4:30 am of the 17th of May 2020. The area was overrun by the State Police as they forcibly evacuated every person in the area protesting and detained many artists and high members of the Albanian opposition. Soon after the demolition started, people started gathering in the main boulevard just before the Ministry of Internal Affairs and the National Theatre to protest its demolition. This protest led to numerous other detainments due to the prohibition of gatherings and protests as per COVID-19 restrictions by the Government.

Playwrights

Theatre Directors

Actors

Agim Qirjaqi
Ahmet Pasha
Anastas Kristofori
Andon Qesari
Bujar Lako
Antoneta Papapavli
Besa Imami
Drita Haxhiraj
Drita Pelingu
Edi Luarasi
Edmond Budina
Elia Zaharia
Fatos Haxhiraj
Ferial Alibali
Genti Deçka
Gjon Karma
Ilia Shyti
Laert Vasili
Lazër Filipi
Loro Kovaçi
Luan Qerimi
Kadri Roshi
Sandër Prosi
Margarita Xhepa
Marie Logoreci
Ndrek Luca
Mihal Popi
Ndriçim Xhepa
Neritan Liçaj
Pavlina Mani
Reshat Arbana
Robert Ndrenika
Roland Trebicka
Roza Anagnosti
Pjetër Gjoka
Prokop Mima
Shkëlqim Basha
Sulejman Pitarka
Viktor Gjoka
Violeta Manushi
Yllka Mujo

Shows

Our Land
Hamlet
The Mayor
Intrigue and Love
The Fisher's FamilyThe Mountains' Girl
A Bridegroom at Fourteen
After DeathThe Auditor
King Lear
Arturo UiKorçë's KarnivalsThe Foreign Herth
The Fox and the Grapes
Bernarda Alba
The Lady of the Inn
Artan
Everybody's Roof
The Second Face
“Njeriu që pa vdekjen me sy”()
The General of the Dead Army
The seven people from Shale
The house on the Boulevard
The Lady from the City
On the Trash
The servant of two Sires
The Big Flood

Theatres throughout Albania
Albania holds other theatres in Vlora, Durres, Shkoder, Fier, Gjirokastër, Berat and Korce

Kujtim Spahivogli National Experimental Theater of Albania
Located in Tirana besides the National Theater, its venues are used by mainly young artists with several successful performances throughout the year.

Children's Theatre
The theatre is situated in the center of Tirana. The Albanian name literally means "The Puppet Theatre". The building used to serve as the Albanian parliament before World War II.

Another professional Children's theatre is in Korçë, under the A. Z. Çajupi theatre.

See also
 List of theatres in Albania

References

Tourist attractions in Tirana
Theatres in Albania
Albania
Theatres completed in 1939
Buildings and structures in Tirana
7 Most Endangered Programme